The Cimarron Football Club, formerly known as Diliman FC is an association football club based in Diliman, Quezon City, Philippines.

History

It was established in 2005 by the alumni of the University of the Philippines, Diliman, and is mainly composed of the former players of the UP Diliman Men's Varsity Football Team.

In recent years, Diliman FC has joined several tournaments including the 2nd season of the United Football League (UFL) where it place 2nd overall. The UFL is the country’s most prestigious football competition. Other tournaments joined were the Republic Cup (Champion) in 2008 and the Laurel Cup (2nd place) in 2010.

Restructuring of the team and the establishment of a formal management group sparked the renewal of operations this year and the team’s reentry into the UFL. This development sets up the club to achieve its long-term goal, which is to professionalize the organization.

2012 season

After a successful 2012 UFL season in which they finished 2nd to Pachanga F.C., almost nearly promoted to Division 1, the club announced that they have merged with Pachanga F.C. following the latter's selling to the group led by Makati Football School and Diliman F.C.  thus both became sister teams in the UFL (which means Diliman will stay in the UFL while Pachanga will have players from Diliman to beef up the roster).

Crest

Honors

Domestic competitions
 United Football League Division 2
Runners-up (1): 2012

References

External links
 

Football clubs in the Philippines
Association football clubs established in 2005
2005 establishments in the Philippines
Sports teams in Metro Manila